This article following is an episode list for the Disney Channel animated series The Emperor's New School.

Disney's The Emperor's New School is a television series companion to the movies The Emperor's New Groove and Kronk's New Groove. This time, Kuzco must graduate school before he can claim the throne and become the official emperor. Besides passing all his classes, he has to keep thwarting attempts by the infamous Yzma and Kronk to stop him. Yzma is now disguised as the principal and Kronk is disguised as a student.

Series overview

Episodes

Season 1 (2006)

Season 2 (2007-08)

References

External links
 
 List of The Emperor's New School episodes at the Internet Movie Database

The Emperor's New Groove (franchise)
Lists of Disney Channel television series episodes
Lists of American children's animated television series episodes